Baccarat is a 1919 German silent drama film directed by Josef Ewald and Bob Holste and starring Ludwig Hartau and Reinhold Schünzel. It premiered at the Marmorhaus in Berlin.

Cast
In alphabetical order

References

Bibliography

External links

1919 films
Films of the Weimar Republic
German silent feature films
German drama films
1919 drama films
German black-and-white films
Films about gambling
Silent drama films
1910s German films